Sioux Treaty may refer to:

Treaties of Portage des Sioux, a series of treaties at Portage des Sioux, Missouri in 1815
Treaty of Traverse des Sioux, an agreement between the United States government and Sioux Indian bands in Minnesota Territory
Sioux Treaty of 1868, an agreement between the United States government and the Lakota, Yanktonai Dakota and Arapaho Nations